Joe Dirt 2: Beautiful Loser is a 2015 American comedy film directed by Fred Wolf and written by David Spade and Fred Wolf. It is the sequel to the 2001 film Joe Dirt. The film stars David Spade, reprising his role as the title character, as well as starring Brittany Daniel, Patrick Warburton, Mark McGrath, Dennis Miller, Christopher Walken, and Adam Beach. The film premiered on Crackle on July 16, 2015.

Plot

Joe Dirt embarks on an epic journey through the recent past, the heartland of America and his own mind to get back to his loved ones.

Cast
 David Spade as Joe Dirt 
 Brittany Daniel as Brandy Dirt
 Patrick Warburton as Foggle/Guardian Angel
 Mark McGrath as Jimmy Yauch
 Dennis Miller as Zander Kelly
 Christopher Walken as Clem Doore
 Allison Gobuzzi as Abilene Dirt
 Lauren Gobuzzi as Cheyenne Dirt
 Chloe Guidry as Dakota Dirt
 Adam Beach as Kickin' Wing aka Kickin' Ass
 Charlotte McKinney as Missy
 Dallas Taylor as Lucky Louie
 Natalia Cigliuti as Dr. Sue
 Baron Davis as 1977 Doctor
 Scott L. Schwartz as Giant Man
 Jeremy Sande as Jimmy's Friend
 Micky Shiloah as Jock
 Terry Ray as Mr. Yauch
 Errol McDowell as Bob Burns
 Caleb Spillyards as Gary Rossington
 Matthew Curry as Ronnie Van Zant
 Mariana Vicente as Flight Attendant
 Fred Wolf as Airplane Tech
 Kevin Farley as Cal
 Colt Ford as himself
 Adam Eget as Buffalo Bob

Production
In the years following the original, David Spade began getting offers from both UFC president Dana White and Kid Rock to help finance a sequel. Ultimately it was Sony who picked up the project after noticing that the film would become a trending topic whenever it came on TV and felt that it would help them build their Crackle platform. The first public hint of a sequel came on  April 30, 2014, David Spade revealed in a Reddit answer that he had written a sequel to Joe Dirt for Crackle, saying: "We wrote a sequel, and we may wind up doing it on Crackle.com, because they want to be the first web address to do a sequel to a movie. Because Sony owns them, and it's a Sony movie. We're trying to find a way to make it for the budget, but we really want to do it. And keep it good." On October 10, 2014, it was announced that Fred Wolf would direct the film, with filming set to start in November 2014. Principal photography began on November 17, 2014. On January 13, 2015, it was announced that Christopher Walken, Dennis Miller, Brittany Daniel and Adam Beach would reprise their roles from the first film, alongside newcomers Mark McGrath and Patrick Warburton.

Release
The film premiered on Crackle on July 16, 2015. In the first five days the film had been viewed one million times and had amassed over 2 million views by August 4, 2015, making it the most viewed original movie on Crackle. Based on average ticket price, Sony claims the viewership numbers are equal to a theatrical box office take of $16 million.

Joe Dirt 2: Beautiful Loser was released on DVD and Blu-ray on January 5, 2016.

Reception
Joe Dirt 2: Beautiful Loser received negative reviews from critics. The review aggregator website Rotten Tomatoes reported a 10% rating based on 10 reviews, with an average rating of 2.5 out of 10.

References

External links
 
 
 

2015 films
American comedy films
2015 comedy films
Happy Madison Productions films
American sequel films
Films directed by Fred Wolf
Films produced by David Spade
Films with screenplays by David Spade
Films with screenplays by Fred Wolf
2010s English-language films
2010s American films